Elias Woodworth, Jr., (born May 13, 1819) was a member of the Wisconsin State Assembly during the first session (1848). He was a Democrat.

Woodworth's father, also named Elias Woodworth, was born in Cayuga County, New York, and was a pioneer settler of Salem, Wisconsin.  The Woodworths are direct descendants of Walter Woodworth, one of the original Plymouth Colony settlers.

Elias, Jr., married Helen Van Wie and had at least seven children.  Sometime after his term in the Assembly, he and his family relocated to Medford, Minnesota.

References

1819 births
Year of death missing
Democratic Party members of the Wisconsin State Assembly